Terry Baucom is an American bluegrass singer, banjo player, and band leader. He is nicknamed "The Duke of Drive" for his propelling banjo style. He leads his band, The Dukes of Drive, and was a founding member of Boone Creek, Doyle Lawson and Quicksilver, and IIIrd Tyme Out.

Biography

Early Years
Baucom began playing banjo at age 10, drawn to banjo because of the Beverly Hillbillies television show. He started playing fiddle at age 14. His father played guitar, his grandfather played clawhammer banjo, and his great-grandfather played fiddle. Baucom played banjo in his father Lloyd Baucom's group The Rocky River Boys. Baucom played fiddle with Charlie Moore from 1970 until 1973.

Boone Creek
In 1976, Baucom was a founding member of Boone Creek at age 22 years old with Ricky Skaggs, Wes Golding, Jerry Douglas and Steve Bryant.

Doyle Lawson and Quicksilver
After two years, Boone Creek disbanded, and Baucom became a founding member of Doyle Lawson's original Quicksilver combo from 1979 until 1985. From 2003 until 2007, Baucom re-joined Doyle Lawson and Quicksilver for a second stint.

The New Quicksilver and BlueRidge
In 1986, Baucom formed the short-lived band The New Quicksilver with Randy Graham (bass), Alan Bibey (mandolin), and Jimmy Haley (guitar). In 1998, Baucom formed BlueRidge, which was a reunited New Quicksilver. In 2001, the ensemble recorded the album Baucom, Bibey, Graham & Haley on Rebel Records.

IIIrd Tyme Out
Baucom was a founding member of IIIrd Tyme Out in 1991 with Russell Moore (guitar], Mike Hargrove (fiddle), and Ray Deaton (bass).

Carolina and Other Opportunities
From 1993, Baucom until 1996, Baucom was a member of Carolina with Lou Reid started the band named Carolina. In 1996, Baucom stopped touring so he could freelance and teach music in the Charlotte, North Carolina area.

He was a part-time member of the Mark Newton Band and the Kenny and Amanda Smith Band. In 2009, Baucom joined Dale Ann Bradley's band, then the Mashville Brigade. He also occasionally performed with Mountain Heart with Tony Rice.

Dukes of Drive
Baucom's current band, "Terry Baucom's Dukes of Drive" consists of Joey Lemons (mandolin, vocals), Will Jones (guitar, vocals), and Joe Hannabach (bass). Their 2015 single "The Rock" was bluegrass radio's most played song on the Bluegrass Today chart.

Solo albums
For his first solo album In a Groove, Baucom put together a core band of Wyatt Rice (guitar), Barry Bales (bass), Adam Steffey (mandolin), and Jason Carter (fiddle). Russell Moore, John Cowan, and Ronnie Bowman make vocal appearances.

2013's Never Thought of Looking Back featured guest vocalists Buddy Melton, Larry Cordle, Sam Bush, Marty Raybon, John Cowen, and Tim Stafford. The instrumentalists include Bush (mandolin), Jerry Douglas (resonator guitar), Wyatt Rice (guitar), Aubrey Haynie (fiddle), and Steve Bryant (bass).

Music Instruction
Baucom produces instructional materials and Baucom teaches banjo privately and at camps and workshops.

Awards
In 2001, Baucom won the International Bluegrass Music Association (IBMA) Instrumental Recording of the Year award. He also won the 2013 IBMA Recorded Event of the Year award for "What'll I Do."

Deering Terry Baucom Model Banjo

The Deering Terry Baucom banjo has a red walnut frame and bronze 20-hole tone ring with an 11/16″ bridge and slightly wider string spacing.

Personal life
Terry's wife Cindy Baucom hosts a syndicated radio show Knee Deep in Bluegrass." She has been named Broadcaster of the Year by the IBMA in 2005 and 2017, and was inducted into the Blue Ridge Music Hall of Fame in  2012.

 Discography 
 Solo albums
 2010: In a Groove (John Boy & Billy, Inc.)
 2013: Never Thought Of Looking Back (John Boy & Billy, Inc.)

With Charlie Moore and the Dixie Partners
 1975: The Fiddler (Old Homestead)
 1983: Country Music Memories Volume 1 (Old Homestead)

 With Boone Creek
 1977: Boone Creek (Rounder)
 1978: One Way Track (Sugar Hill)

 With Doyle Lawson and Quicksilver
 1979: Doyle Lawson & Quicksilver (Sugar Hill)
 1981: Rock My Soul (Sugar Hill)
 1982: Quicksilver Rides Again (Sugar Hill)
 1983: Heavenly Treasures (Sugar Hill)
 1985: Once & for Always (Sugar Hill)
 2004: A School of Bluegrass (Crossroads)
 2005: You Gotta Dig a Little Deeper (Rounder)
 2006: He Lives in Me (Horizon)
 2007: More Behind the Picture Than the Wall (Rounder)

 With The New Quicksilver 
 1986: Ready for the Times (Cross Current)

 With IIIrd Tyme Out
 1991: IIIrd Tyme Out (Rebel)
 1992: Puttin' New Roots Down (Rebel)

 With Lou Reid
 1991: When It Rains (Sugar Hill)
 1993: Carolina Blue (Webco)
 1994: Carolina Moon (Rebel) as Terry Baucom, Lou Reid, and Carolina

 With Blueridge
 1999: Common Ground (Sugar Hill)

 As Baucom, Bibey and BlueRidge 
 2002: Come Along With Me (Sugar Hill)

 With Terry Baucom's Dukes of Drive
 2016: Around the Corner (John Boy & Billy, Inc.)
 2017: 4th and Goal (John Boy & Billy, Inc.)

 Also appears on
 1974: L. W. Lambert and the Blue River Boys - Natural Grass (United Music World)
 1975: Ricky Skaggs - That's It (Rebel)
 1977: Dan & Jenny Brock - High Flying (Lemco Studio)
 1979: Jerry Douglas - Fluxology (Rounder)
 1987: Jerry Douglas - Everything Is Gonna Work Out Fine (Rounder)
 1998: Ronnie Bowman - The Man I'm Tryin' to Be (Sugar Hill)
 2000: Alan Bibey - In the Blue Room (Sugar Hill)
 2000: Herschel Sizemore - My Style (Hay Holler)
 2001  Candlewyck – Firemen (Votive Records)
 2009: Grasstowne - The Other Side of Towne (Pinecastle)
 2009: Jim Lauderdale - Could We Get Any Closer? (Sky Crunch)
 2009: Brad Wood - For a Reason (Cotton Top)

Music Instruction
 Terry Baucom: The Duke of Drive VHS (AcuTab)
 1995: AcuTab transcriptions Vol. 1 book (AcuTab)
 2007: Driving with the Duke: Banjo Techniques if Terry Baucom'' DVD (John Boy & Billy, Inc.)

References

External links 
 
 
 

1952 births
Bluegrass musicians from North Carolina
American country banjoists
Country musicians from North Carolina
American country singer-songwriters
People from Monroe, North Carolina
Living people
Singer-songwriters from North Carolina